Minyas may refer to:

Minyas (moth), a moth genus
Minyas (mythology), the founder of Orchomenus
Minyas (poem), a Greek epic poem
according to Nicolas of Damascus, a region of Armenia: see Minyans